Sepak takraw was contested at the 2007 Asian Indoor Games in Macau, China from October 31 to November 3. The competition took place at the Workers Sports Pavilion.

Medalists

Medal table

Results

Men

1st round
31 October

2nd round
1 November

Knockout round

Women

1st round
31 October

2nd round
1 November

Knockout round

References
Macau Indoor Games Official Website

2007 Asian Indoor Games events
2007